The 2001 Internationaux de Strasbourg was a women's tennis tournament played on outdoor clay courts. It was the 15th edition of the Internationaux de Strasbourg, and was part of the Tier III Series of the 2001 WTA Tour. The tournament took place at the Centre Sportif de Hautepierre in Strasbourg, France, from 21 May until 26 May 2001. Eighth-seeded Silvia Farina Elia won the singles title and earned $27,000 first-prize money.

Finals

Singles
 Silvia Farina Elia defeated  Anke Huber 7–5, 0–6, 6–4
 It was Farina Elia's first singles title of her career.

Doubles
 Silvia Farina Elia /  Iroda Tulyaganova defeated  Amanda Coetzer /  Lori McNeil 6–1, 7–6(7–0)

References

External links
 ITF tournament edition details 
 Tournament draws

Internationaux de Strasbourg
2001
Internationaux de Strasbourg
Internationaux de Strasbourg